Zdbice  is a village in the administrative district of Gmina Wałcz, within Wałcz County, West Pomeranian Voivodeship, in north-western Poland.

The village has a population of 150.

Zdbice are popular tourist destination for its large and clean lake, excluded cape with summer houses build on it, old German Nazi fortifications and forests.

References

Zdbice